William C. Harper (born 1944) is an American jewelry artist known for studio craft jewelry.

Biography
Born in Bucyrus, Ohio, in 1944.  He received a BS in 1966 and an MS in education in 1967, both from Case Western Reserve University in Cleveland, Ohio.  He also studied advanced enameling techniques at the Cleveland Institute of Art.
Harper began his career as an abstract painter but in the early 1960s switched to enameling.  Many of his creations relate to mythology and ritual objects, and his work was included in the exhibition One of a Kind: The Studio Craft Movement at the Metropolitan Museum of Art in New York City, December 22, 2006 – September 3, 2007.

Currently resides in New York City.

He should not be confused with the Afro-American sculptor and painter William A. Harper (1873–1910) or the American painter William St. John Harper (1851–1910).

References
 Harper, William, The Art of William Harper, Enameled Jewelry and Objects, New York, Kennedy Galleries, 1981.
 Harper, William, William Harper, Jasper's Variations and Faberge's Seeds, New York, Peter Joseph Gallery, 1994.
 Harper, William, William Harper, Tallahassee, Fla., University Fine Arts Galleries, 1980.
 Manhart, Tom, William Harper, Artist as Alchemist, Orlando, Fla., Orlando Museum of Art, 1989.

1944 births
Living people
People from Bucyrus, Ohio
American enamelers
21st-century enamellers
20th-century enamellers
American jewellers
21st-century ceramists